Lovers Again is the sixth studio album by American recording artist Alexander O'Neal.

Track listing
"Do You Right" - 4:24
"Let's Get Together" - 4:26
"Lovers Again" - 3:31
"Can You Stand the Rain" - 4:23
"Baby Come to Me" - 4:01 
"No One But You" - 4:42
"Body Talkin'" - 4:24
"More Than My Heart" - 4:08
"Sleepin'" - 4:27
"Carry On" - 5:04
"Sneakin'" - 5:23
"Our Love" - 4:07
"Grind" - 4:54
"If We Get It On" - 4:15 (Japan only)
"Cry" - 4:42 (Japan only)
Note: on the Japan release "Baby Come to Me" is a remixed version

Personnel

Credits are adapted from the album's liner notes.

"Do You Right"
 Written by: Dr. Pelè Kazir
 John Strawberry Fields - guitar sample
 Backing vocals - Dr. Pelè Kazir, Marvin Gunn, Bruce DeShazer, Alexander O'Neal
"Let's Get Together"
 Written by: Dr. Pelè Kazir
 David Eiland - saxophone
 Mike Scott - guitars
 Backing vocals - Dr. Pelè Kazir, Marvin Gunn, Bruce DeShazer [KoKo-Blak], Trianita
"Lovers Again"
 Written by: B-Cube (Ben Obi) and Dr. Pelè Kazir
 David Eiland - saxophone
 backing vocals - Dr. Pelè Kazir, Marvin Gunn, Reggie Wilson, Alexander O'Neal
"Can You Stand the Rain"
 Written by: Dr. Pelè Kazir
 David Eiland - saxophone
 Derek Russell - bass guitar
 Backing vocals - Dr. Pelè Kazir, Marvin Gunn, Bruce DeShazer [KoKo-Blak]
"Baby Come to Me"
 Milton McDonald - guitars
 David Phillips - additional keyboards
 Paul Meeham - programming
 Sam Noel - programming, technician
 Backing vocals - Beverly Skeete, Weston Forster
"No One But You"
 Written by: Dr. Pelè Kazir
 B-Cube (Ben Obi) - additional keyboards, drum programming
 Backing vocals - Tammy, Tisha, Davidra [Ashanti]
"Body Talking"
 Written by: Dr. Pelè Kazir
 B-Cube (Ben Obi) - additional programming 
 David Gonzalez - bass sample
 Mike Scott - guitar sample
 Backing vocals - Dr. Pelè Kazir, Alexander O'Neal
"More Than My Heart" 
 Prince Sampson - guitars
 Kevin Robinson - brass
 Fayyaz Virji - brass
 Bud Beadle - brass
 Paul Meehan - programming
 Sam Noel - technician
 Backing vocals - Weston forster, Beverly Skeete
"Sleepin'"
 Prince Sampson - guitars
 Chris Offen - guitars
 David Phillips - additional keyboards
 Harry Morgan - percussion
 Paul Meehan - programming
 Sam Noel - programming, technician
"Carry On"
 Prince Sampson - guitars
 David Phillips - organ
 Kevin Robinson - brass
 Fayyaz Virji - brass
 Bud Beadle - brass
 Paul Meehan - programming
 Sam Noel - technician
 Backing vocals - Weston Forster, Beverly Skeete, Marcia Escoffery, Robert Thompson
"Sneakin'"
 Nick Mundy - programming, backing vocals
"Our Love"
 Toby Baker - keyboards, synthesizers
 Billy Osbourne - drum programming, percussion
 Paul Stoner - synclavier programming
 Backing vocals and arrangements - Gee Morris, Alexander O'Neal
"Grind"
 Nick Mundy - programming
 Hazel Fernandes - additional lead vocals
 Errol Reid - rap sample
 Backing vocals - D. Harvey, Nick Mundy

Charts

Release history

References

External links

Alexander O'Neal albums
1996 albums